Chen Chieh-ju (born 25 November 1937) is a Taiwanese politician.

Education
Chen attended primary and secondary school in his native Taichung and later studied at National Cheng Kung University.

Political career
Chen served three terms on the Taichung County Council before running for a seat on the Legislative Yuan in 1992. He won reelection in 1995 and 1998. He joined the Non-Partisan Solidarity Union in 2004 as the newly founded political party's secretary-general. Chen supported Ma Ying-jeou in the 2012 presidential election.

References

1937 births
Living people
Kuomintang Members of the Legislative Yuan in Taiwan
Members of the 2nd Legislative Yuan
Members of the 3rd Legislative Yuan
Members of the 4th Legislative Yuan
National Cheng Kung University alumni
Taichung Members of the Legislative Yuan
Non-Partisan Solidarity Union politicians
Party List Members of the Legislative Yuan